Douglas Dawson Wilson (30 January 1931 – 18 May 2019) was a New Zealand rugby union player.

On that tour, he played 14 matches, including two internationals, and scored five tries and one drop goal.

He died in Kowhainui Hospital, Whanganui, on 18 May 2019. He had been married to Janice for 64 years.

References

1931 births
2019 deaths
Rugby union players from Whanganui
People educated at Christchurch Boys' High School
New Zealand rugby union players
New Zealand international rugby union players
Canterbury rugby union players
Wellington rugby union players
Rugby union fly-halves
Rugby union centres